Lloyd is a small unincorporated community and census-designated place (CDP) in Jefferson County, Florida, United States. As of the 2020 census,the population was 187.

Geography
Lloyd is in western Jefferson County, bordered on its western side by Leon County. Interstate 10 forms the northern edge of the community and provides access from Exit 217. I-10 leads east  to Lake City and west  to Tallahassee, the state capital.

Demographics

Historic places
 Lloyd Railroad Depot is now the post office.
 St. Clement's Chapel was built in Lloyd in 1890 as St. Clement's Episcopal Church. It was closed in 1958 and the building moved to Tallahassee.

Education
Jefferson County Schools operates public schools, including Jefferson County Middle / High School.

Notable person
Writer and novelist Mary Edwards Bryan was born in Lloyd circa 1838.

References

Unincorporated communities in Jefferson County, Florida
Tallahassee metropolitan area
Unincorporated communities in Florida
Former municipalities in Florida
Census-designated places in Florida